Pine Lake is a lake in Rusk and Chippewa Counties, Wisconsin. The bottom of the lake is 50% sand, 30% gravel, 15% rock, and 5% muck. Pine Lake is a seepage lake, which does not have an inlet or outlet and gets its water mostly from precipitation or runoff. Because of this, water levels tend to fluctuate seasonally.

Wildlife 
Largemouth bass are the most common fish in the lake, which also contains panfish and northern pike in smaller quantities. Loons, turtles, snakes, beavers, bears, deer, chipmunks, and rabbits are also found in the surrounding area.

Homes 
Pine Lake has houses on about half its shoreline, with about 40 houses near the lake. The houses were built by a few men from Chicago who bought the land.

References

Further reading 

 Schmidt, Sara, and Kristina Beuning. Pine Lake, Wisconsin: Science and Settlement of a Tranquil Repose. La Crosse, Wis.: Pine Lake Association, 2005.

Lakes of Chippewa County, Wisconsin
Lakes of Rusk County, Wisconsin